The following Union Army units and commanders fought in the Battle of Carthage of the American Civil War. The Confederate order of battle is listed separately.

Abbreviations used

Military Rank
 Col = Colonel
 Ltc = Lieutenant Colonel
 Maj = Major
 Cpt = Captain

Union Forces
Col Franz Sigel

See also

 Missouri in the American Civil War

References
 Hinze, David C. & Karen Farnham. The Battle of Carthage:  Border War in Southwest Missouri, July 5, 1861 (Campbell, CA:  Savas Publishing Company), 1997.  

American Civil War orders of battle
Missouri in the American Civil War